The Law of 4 February 1794 was a decree of the French National Convention which abolished slavery in all French colonies.

Background 

In 1789, the abolitionist Amis des noirs society was established in France. It was more radical than similar organizations in Britain, seeking to abolish slavery rather than solely the slave trade. It ultimately proved unable to accomplish this goal and is perceived by modern historians as ineffective. At the beginning of the French Revolution, a measure to abolish slavery was proposed and then dropped due to opposition from the nobility. In 1790, the National Assembly affirmed its support for the institution of slavery.

The colony of Saint-Domingue in particular was important to the French economy. A 1791 slave revolt took control of large parts of the colony and by 1793 Britain was threatening to invade the colony while Spain was already waging an undeclared war from Santo Domingo. 
These internal and external struggles led to a progressive abolition of slavery in Saint-Domingue. In a first time, beginning during the destruction of the Cap, in June 1793, only the slaves who would fight on the side of the commissioners Sonthonax and Polverel could be freed. Then, on 27 August 1793, Polverel freed also, in the West province, the slaves who worked on the plantations where there were no more masters. On 29 August 1793, Sonthonax abolished slavery in the North province. Polverel freed progressively other slaves in the two others provinces of the West and the South, and, on 31 October 1793, he proclaimed slavery abolished in them too.  

This was a strategic measure to help strengthen the French Republican cause against the Spanish and British, as slavery was legal in the overseas colonies of both nations. This proclamation was not universally well-received even among the enslaved population of Saint-Domingue; Toussaint Louverture, a former slave who was fighting with the Spanish at the time, doubted its sincerity. Louverture then began pressuring the Spanish to issue a similar proclamation.

Enactment 
Sonthonax sent delegates back to Paris to advocate for emancipation. While the delegates were briefly arrested by opponents of Sonthonax, they were well-received by the National Convention, where they justified the earlier proclamation on both practical and moral grounds. After their speeches, Jean-François Delacroix exclaimed that the Convention should not "dishonor itself by a long discussion", and so the Convention passed the law by acclamation.

The law read as follows:

The National Convention declares slavery abolished throughout all the colonies: consequently, it decrees that all men, without distinction of color, domiciliated in the colonies, are French citizens, and entitled to the enjoyment of all the rights secured by the Constitution.

Referred to the Committee of Public Safety for it to report immediately on the measures to be taken for the execution of the decree.

Effect

In French colonies 

After passing the law, the Committee of Public Safety sent 1,200 troops to France's Caribbean colonies to enforce it. They recaptured Guadeloupe from a coalition of British and French royalists and used that as a base from which to retake other islands. The law did succeed in winning over Black support for the French Republican cause, which greatly benefited them. The law may have influenced Louverture to switch sides from the Spanish to the French Republic, though it is unclear whether he knew of the law early enough for it to have influenced his decision. Implementation of the law did not always create a change in material conditions. In Guadeloupe, the former slaves were effectively restricted to plantations by laws against vagrancy and were not given the pay they were legally owed. In Saint-Domingue, as well, the Republicans attempted to maintain plantations, which caused conflict with the newly freed slaves, who wanted autonomy.

In other colonies 

The French colonists spread copies of the law, as well as other revolutionary documents such as the Declaration of the Rights of Man, throughout the region. This helped to spark slave revolts in Venezuela, Brazil, Jamaica and Cuba.

Revocation 

The Coup of 18 Brumaire and the rise to power of Napoleon led to a reversal of French interests. Reinstating slavery would placate the British and American governments, who were worried that a free Black-run state would inspire slave revolts, as well as French property owners who wanted control back. Additionally, Napoleon wanted to regain control over Saint-Domingue, which was effectively independent under the leadership of Louverture. Thus, the Law of 20 May 1802 reinstated slavery and the slave trade.

References

Bibliography 
 
  
 
 

Abolitionism in France
1794 in law
French National Convention
1794 events of the French Revolution
Law of France
Slavery legislation